Chantilly-Gouvieux is a railway station on the TER Hauts-de-France regional rail network in Chantilly, France.

Service
There is TER service at Chantilly-Gouvieux complemented by RER D service.

References

External links

 

Railway stations in Oise
Railway stations in France opened in 1859